Jean Périsson (6 July 1924 in Arcachon – 18 February 2019) was a French conductor.

Career
A pupil of Jean Fournet, he won the first prize at the Besançon conducting competition in 1952. He was assistant to Igor Markevitch at the Salzburg Mozarteum, and was chief conductor of the Strasbourg Radio Orchestra from 1955-56. He was music director for the city of Nice from 1956-65, giving Wagner cycles (with artists from Bayreuth). He was a permanent conductor at the Paris Opera from 1965-69 and led an early French production of Káťa Kabanová at the Salle Favart. He conducted in San Francisco, Ankara and Beijing.

The 1952 winner of International Besançon Competition for Young Conductors, he was invited by the People’s Republic of China to hold a one-month position with China National Symphony (formerly Central Philharmonic Society) in May 1980. He later conducted and recorded Bizet’s Carmen with Central Opera Theatre of China in 1982.

Publications
 Une Vie de héraut : Un chef d'orchestre dans le siècle, Paris, Éditions L'Harmattan , July 2014, 318 p.  Mémoires.
 Jacques Offenbach - Les Contes d'Hoffmann. Commentaire littéraire et musical. Ed. L'Avant-scène Opéra N°25 (January/February 1980)

Sources
 
 José Beckmans: Prisonnier de son art - mémoires - (1989). Ed. Librairie Séguier
 Jacques Lonchampt: Regards sur l'opéra de Verdi à Georges Aperghis Ed. L'Harmattan 2003

References

External links
 Discography on Discogs
 Perisson on the Who's who
 Régine Crespin (Cassandre), Les Troyens Berlioz San Francisco1966, dir Jean Périsson (YouTube)

1924 births
2019 deaths
Place of death missing
People from Arcachon
École Normale de Musique de Paris alumni
French male conductors (music)
French male musicians
20th-century French conductors (music)
21st-century French conductors (music)
20th-century French male musicians
21st-century French male musicians